Creekside may refer:

 The bank (geography) of a creek.

In the United States:
Creekside, Kentucky, a city in Jefferson County
Creekside, Pennsylvania, a borough in Indiana County
Creekside (Morganton, North Carolina), an NRHP-listed house

In the United Kingdom:
A regeneration area beside Deptford Creek in London, that is used for educational and artistic purposes: Deptford#Culture and community

In Canada:
 a region of the Whistler Blackcomb ski resort, which was used for the 2010 Winter Olympics alpine events.
 Creekside Village (disambiguation), multiple uses

See also

 
 Riverside (disambiguation)
 Creek (disambiguation)
 Side (disambiguation)